Juan Ramón Carrasco Torres (born 15 September 1956) is a Uruguayan football coach and former player. He is one of the players who had the most appearances, in different rosters, in Uruguay.

Playing career
Born in Sarandi del Yí, Uruguay, Carrasco started his career in 1973 playing for Nacional. He played 19 times for Uruguay, for whom he scored three goals.

Carrasco also played for River Plate and Racing Club in Argentina, and played professional football in Mexico, Brazil, Spain, Colombia and Venezuela.

Coaching career
Carrasco started coaching in 2000. He won his first title as the coach of Uruguayan Nacional in Uruguayan First Division. His best international performance was made in River Plate during 2009 as the team reached the semi-finals for Copa Sudamericana. On July 6, 2011, he signed with Emelec of Ecuador to replace Omar "el Turco" Asad. On November 27, six months later, he resigned. On December 26, he signed with Atlético Paranaense of Brazil. He played as an attacking midfielder.

Between 2003 and 2004, Carrasco was the manager of Uruguay.

References

1956 births
Living people
Association football midfielders
Uruguayan footballers
Club Nacional de Football players
Danubio F.C. players
Club Atlético River Plate (Montevideo) players
C.A. Bella Vista players
Peñarol players
Rampla Juniors players
Tecos F.C. footballers
Club Atlético River Plate footballers
Racing Club de Avellaneda footballers
Cádiz CF players
São Paulo FC players
Rocha F.C. players
Uruguayan Primera División players
Argentine Primera División players
Liga MX players
La Liga players
Venezuelan Primera División players
Uruguayan expatriate footballers
Expatriate footballers in Argentina
Expatriate footballers in Brazil
Expatriate footballers in Colombia
Expatriate footballers in Mexico
Expatriate footballers in Spain
Expatriate footballers in Venezuela
Uruguayan football managers
Rocha F.C. managers
Centro Atlético Fénix managers
River Plate Montevideo managers
Uruguay national football team managers
Club Nacional de Football managers
Club Athletico Paranaense managers
Danubio F.C. managers
C.S. Marítimo de Venezuela players
Expatriate football managers in Brazil
Campeonato Brasileiro Série B managers
Uruguayan Primera División managers